Dennis is an unincorporated community and census-designated place (CDP) in Delaware County, Oklahoma, near Grand Lake. The population was 195 at the 2010 census. The Dennis Post Office existed from March 25, 1914, until January 31, 1956. It is said to be named for a local resident, Peter Dennis.

Geography
Dennis is located in north-central Delaware County at  (36.543347, -94.858091), on the south side of Grand Lake.

Demographics

As of the census of 2000, there were 185 people, 77 households, and 64 families residing in the CDP. The population density was 40.9 people per square mile (15.8/km2). There were 217 housing units at an average density of 48.0/sq mi (18.5/km2). The racial makeup of the CDP was 87.03% White, 7.57% Native American, and 5.41% from two or more races. Hispanic or Latino of any race were 0.54% of the population.

There were 77 households, out of which 28.6% had children under the age of 18 living with them, 79.2% were married couples living together, 2.6% had a female householder with no husband present, and 15.6% were non-families. 13.0% of all households were made up of individuals, and 6.5% had someone living alone who was 65 years of age or older. The average household size was 2.40 and the average family size was 2.63.

In the CDP, the population was spread out, with 21.6% under the age of 18, 3.2% from 18 to 24, 20.5% from 25 to 44, 33.0% from 45 to 64, and 21.6% who were 65 years of age or older. The median age was 49 years. For every 100 females, there were 98.9 males. For every 100 females age 18 and over, there were 104.2 males.

The median income for a household in the CDP was $38,542, and the median income for a family was $38,542. Males had a median income of $36,500 versus $19,583 for females. The per capita income for the CDP was $14,366. None of the population or families were below the poverty line.

References

Further reading
 Shirk, George H. Oklahoma Place Names; University of Oklahoma Press; Norman, Oklahoma; 1987: .

Census-designated places in Delaware County, Oklahoma
Census-designated places in Oklahoma